The Australian Operational Service Medal is a campaign medal established on 22 May 2012 to recognise service by Australian Defence Force (ADF) personnel on designated hazardous operations. It may also be awarded to civilians who serve alongside the ADF on designated operations under specific conditions.

It replaces the Australian Active Service Medal and Australian Service Medal for future ADF operations. The medal is issued to military personnel with a different ribbon for each designated operation. When issued to civilians, a standard ribbon is issued with clasps issued for each designated operation.

Overview
The Australian Operational Service Medal is a campaign medal established by Royal Letters Patent on 22 May 2012.  This campaign medal was instituted as a replacement for future issues of the Australian Active Service Medal and Australian Service Medal  and operational campaign medals for the Australian Defence Force, as well as to recognise the service of Defence civilians in declared operational areas. It is awarded as either a military or civilian variant.

Military version
The military version of the medal has a standard medal design, but ribbons vary by operation.  An accumulated service device will be awarded for subsequent qualifying service by ADF members where they undertake further service on an operation for which they have already been awarded the Australian Operational Service Medal.

Ribbons
To date, four ribbons for ADF service have been announced:

Civilian version
The civilian version uses the same medal design as the military version, but is awarded with a unique civilian ribbon and a clasp denoting the declared operation. Subsequent qualifying service for civilians will be (is) denoted by clasps.

Clasps
Clasps announced (and awarded) to date are listed below.

Variants for declared operations – Military version

Australian Operational Service Medal – Border Protection (AOSM-BP)
The variant for border protection operations was announced on 19 July 2012. This variant will be (is) awarded to Australian Defence Force personnel who have served on border protection operations since 1997. The ribbon for the medal is 32 mm wide with a central stripe of ochre flanked by one blue stripe and one green stripe of equal width.

The declared operations are:

Personnel who served on naval vessels, maritime patrol aircraft or Regional Force Surveillance Unit patrols whilst assigned to any of these operations may be eligible.

Members of the Australian Defence Force must have served either an aggregate of 30 days either deployed or force assigned as a member of one of the declared operations, or were deployed or force assigned to a declared operation and completed 30 sorties from a unit assigned to the operation, so long as the sorties were conducted over a period of not less than 30 aggregate days with no more than one sortie counted per day.

Members must also have been:
Deployed at sea directly supporting a declared operation
Deployed on land or in the air, dedicated in support of a declared operation
Deployed forward to exclusively support a declared operation.

Exclusions
Members are not eligible for an award of the AOSM-BP where an entitlement exists to another Australian medal for the same deployment.

Members are not eligible for an award of the AOSM-BP where the member was part of:

 Headquarters staff at Joint Operations Command;
 Headquarters staff at Northern Command;
 Headquarters staff at Military Strategic Commitments;
 Headquarters staff at Regional Force Surveillance Unit;
 Australian Defence Force staff at Border Protection Command; or
 Base maintainers and support personnel
 Rifle Company Butterworth personnel providing direct support to Border Protection operations via airfield and aircraft security.

Australian Operational Service Medal – Greater Middle East Operation (AOSM-GMEO)

The eligibility requirements for this medal are:
 30 days service, continuous or aggregated, on either of the below operations
 The ADF member is force assigned for operational duties.

The declared operations are:

Clasps for declared operations – Civilian version

On 12 December 2012, the Governor-General declared, for the purposes of the Australian Operational Service Medal Regulation 2012, a number of declared operations, and determined the conditions for award of Clasps.

General conditions for all Clasps include
 awarded to a civilian who was employed for duty on the declared operation for a period of not less than an aggregate of 30 days;

Specific conditions for each Clasp include

See also
Australian Honours Order of Precedence
Australian campaign medals
Australia Service Medal 1939–45
Australian Active Service Medal 1945–1975
Australian Active Service Medal
Australian Service Medal 1945–1975
Australian Service Medal
Police Overseas Service Medal (Australia)
Humanitarian Overseas Service Medal
National Emergency Medal (Australia)
Civilian Service Medal 1939–1945
List of military operations involving Australia

References

External links
Image of medals laid out prior to presentation, Royal Australian Navy Media Library.
Australian Operational Service Medal, www.defence.gov.au 
Australian Operational Service Medal – Border Protection, www.defence.gov.au 
Australian Operational Service Medal – Civilian, www.defence.gov.au

Australian campaign medals
2012 establishments in Australia
Awards established in 2012